Manuelita is a Colombian agribusiness corporation, headquartered in Palmira, Valle del Cauca, Colombia,  whose main products are refined sugar, ethanol, palm oil, biodiesel, mussels, shrimp and fruits and vegetables.

Manuelita was founded in 1864 when James Martin Eder, better known in Colombia as don Santiago Eder, an American citizen born in Mitau, Courland, bought the hacienda "La Manuelita", located near Palmira, from the father of famed Colombian novelist Jorge Isaacs at a public auction.  The farm's namesake was Manuela Ferrer Scarpetta, Isaacs' mother.

Eder planted various crops, including coffee in the farm, but eventually centered on sugar, and "on the first day of the first year of the twentieth century" he inaugurated a new sugar mill which had Colombia's first steam engine, and replaced the former ox-powered mill.

After don Santiago's retirement in 1903, Manuelita continued to grow under the leadership of his sons Charles James Eder, and Henry James Eder, his grandson Harold Henry Eder Caicedo, and his great-grandson Henry James Eder Caicedo, who is still chairman of the board.  As of April 1, 2008, don Santiago's great-great-grandson Harold Enrique Eder Garcés is President of IMSA. In 1980, the size of the company was cut in half, after barely surviving a hostile takeover attempt by the Carlos Ardila Lülle's business group. This unfortunate incident resulted in the split of the Ingenio Manuelita and Ingenio del Cauca sugar mills. This latter mill had been founded by Harold Henry Eder while he was at the head of the Eder Family enterprise and was hence a great loss to the family both economically and sentimentally.

Under Henry J. Eder's stewardship (1965–2008), Manuelita's standing in Colombia's sugar sector in terms of production was fully recovered and even surpassed when compared to Manuelita and Ingenio del Cauca's combined production levels in 1980. During this period of time, Manuelita also expanded its sugar production to ventures in Peru and Brasil, including a project named Arena Dulce, or Sweet Sand, in which nearly 2000 hectares of Peruvian desert were planted in sugarcane using vanguard drip irrigation technology adapted by Manuelita technicians to the specificities of cane cultivation and harvesting and which are producing record levels of tons of cane per hectare and percentage of sucrose in cane.  Additionally, Henry Eder diversified Manuelita into other products and countries in order to diversify risk, namely shrimp (Colombia), mussels (Chile), palm oil (Colombia), ethanol (Colombia, Brazil, Peru), asparagus (Peru), and table grapes (Peru).

Many details of Manuelita's business affairs from the nineteenth and early twentieth centuries are preserved at the Phanor James Eder Collection at the University of Miami, which includes a great deal of don Santiago's business correspondence.

Manuelita owned companies and subsidiaries

Colombia 

1. Manuelita Azúcar y Energía (Manuelita Sugar and Energy) is Colombia's oldest sugar mill and the original business of the Manuelita group of companies. Currently Manuelita Azúcar y Energía is served by 25,000 hectares of land, 15,000 of which are company owned, and has a crushing capacity of 10,000 tons of cane per day, making it the second largest mill in Colombia after Ingenio del Cauca, a mill that was founded by Harold Henry Eder Caicedo and the Manuelita Group in the 1950s. Currently, Manuelita Azúcar y Energía produces nearly 300,000 tons of high quality refined sugar per year, and has a fuel ethanol production capacity of 250,000 lts per day (80,000 m3/year). It is one of Colombia's first fuel bio ethanol producers and its most efficient producer. Given Manuelita's strict adherence to a sound environmental policy, the company's ethanol production process is geared to produce as little vinasse as possible (2 liters of vinasse per liter of ethanol vs. 12-20 liters of vinasse per liter of ethanol in standard plants).

2. Manuelita Aceites y Energía (Manuelita Oil and Energy) is an African palm oil processing company based in Bogota, Colombia, but with operations in the Meta and Casanare departments of Colombia. The Meta plant, known as Yaguarito, was a greenfield project started in 1986 in the cattle lands of Colombia's Eastern Plains. The Company owns approximately 15,000 hectares of palm and is served by an additional 20,000 hectares of palm owned by independent farmers. Each year the Yaguarito operation processes nearly 150,000 tons of fruit and produces refined palm oil, bio diesel and other sub-products. In 2009, Manuelita purchased a 25,000 hectare property in Casanare province to set up a second palm oil processing operation which will also look to primarily produce refined palm oil and bio diesel. Palmar de Altamira's new processing plant started operating in 2014. This new operation is also a greenfield project to be laid out in cattle lands. Special attention is being given to environmental concerns, however, so as to ensure that the native flora and fauna of this Colombian frontier region are not adversely affected by Manuelita's arrival.

3. Océanos is a 99,9% owned subsidiary of Manuelita and the world's largest contiguous shrimp farm with 148 production pools covering a total area of 1,052 hectares. Oceanos produces over 10,000 tons of shrimp per year and exports 90% of its production primarily to Europe, Japan and the United States.

Peru 

1. Agroindustrial Laredo is one of the most competitive and fourth largest sugar producer in Peru. It currently produces over 100.000 metric tons of high quality refined sugar per year. Laredo's mill has a cane crushing capacity of 5,000 metric tons per day and is served with sugarcane that is cultivated in over 15,000 hectares of land. The company owns and cultivates cane on nearly 8,000 hectares of company owned land, including almost 1,000 hectares of desert which Manuelita technicians were able to successfully plant with cane using drip irrigation technology and taking full advantage of the Chavimochic irrigation canal.

Chile 

1. Mejillones America is a mussel farm located outside of Puerto Montt, Chile on Chiloe Island that was founded in 2003. MA is being developed into a vertically integrated operation throughout the entire value chain of the business from the actual farming, to processing, packaging and commercialization. MA's processing plant processes both company cultivated and third party cultivated mussels.

Brazil 

1. Vale do Parana is a special purpose company established in Brazil to grow sugar cane, construct, and operate a state-of-the-art mill to produce fuel ethanol and sugar in Suzanapolis, western region of the State of São Paulo, Brazil.

References

External links
Manuelita - the company website.
EDER, FAMILIA - article at the Luis Ángel Arango Library, which is administered by Colombia's Bank of the Republic, the central bank.
Phanor James Eder Collection at the University of Miami
Mejillones America S.A.

Agriculture companies of Colombia
Sugar companies
Palm oil production in Colombia
Companies established in 1864